Mercerville is an unincorporated community in Gallia County in southern Ohio, approximately  north of Crown City and  northeast of Huntington, West Virginia, near the easternmost corner of Wayne National Forest and roughly  west of the Ohio River, where Ohio borders West Virginia. Mercerville sits along State Route 218 (SR 218) near its intersection with SR 790. It is home to South Gallia High School, one of only three high schools in the entire county, and nearby Hannan Trace Elementary School.

Mercerville is often mistaken for Crown City because Mercerville does not have its own US Post Office, much in the same way that nearby Rio Grande, Ohio, mailing addresses all say Bidwell.

References

Geography of Gallia County, Ohio